Gustav Mader (28 March 1899 – 18 April 1945) was an Austrian bobsledder. He competed in the four-man event at the 1928 Winter Olympics. He was killed in action during World War II.

References

1899 births
1945 deaths
Austrian male bobsledders
Olympic bobsledders of Austria
Bobsledders at the 1928 Winter Olympics
Sportspeople from Vienna
Austrian military personnel killed in World War II